Round Island (Imlichin in Aleut) is a 0.1-mile-wide (160 m) island in the Krenitzin Islands, a subgroup of the Fox Islands group of the Aleutian Islands in the U.S. state of Alaska.

References

Krenitzin Islands
Islands of Alaska
Islands of Aleutians East Borough, Alaska